Malaysia claims an exclusive economic zone (EEZ) of  with  from its shores. The EEZ includes much of the southern area of the South China Sea. The coastline comprises two distinct parts of Malaysia. They are separated by the South China Sea. Peninsular Malaysia borders Thailand in the north, while East Malaysia borders Brunei and Indonesia on the island of Borneo.

Disputes

Territory 
Malaysia has territorial disputes in the South China Sea mainly with the People's Republic of China. The nine-dash line runs through Malaysia's Exclusive Economic Zone in the South China Sea and would reduce Malaysia's EEZ by 2/5th.

In the latter half of the 1970s, Malaysia and the Philippines began referring to the Spratly Islands as included in their own territory. On 11 June 1978, President Ferdinand Marcos of the Philippines issued the Presidential decree No. 1596, declaring the north-western part of the Spratly Islands (referred to therein as the Kalayaan Island Group) as Philippine territory. Since the 1990s, Malaysia occupies 5 of the Spratly Islands. China's construction of artificial islands and military bases has shifted the balance of power mostly towards China in the South China Sea. Other than the South China Sea, Malaysia has maritime disputes with Indonesia in the Ambalat Block located at the north-western extremity of the Celebes Sea where Indonesia claims an EEZ all the way to Malaysian territorial waters off the coast of Pulau Sipadan that almost triggered a naval standoff in May 2009

Illegal fishing 
There are recorded illegal fishing activities by Filipino and Vietnamese fishing boats in Malaysia's EEZ. Such as in 2016 they were caught and detained by the Royal Malaysian Navy. This is due to an increase in demand for seafood. There is a shrinking stock of marine life due to pollution and excessive fishing. Vietnamese fishermen travel further away from Vietnam due to severe water pollution by a Taiwanese steel plant in Vietnam which damaged marine life. On 16 August 2020, a Malaysia Maritime Enforcement Agency (MMEA) vessel had reportedly shot dead a Vietnamese fisherman and also captured the fishing vessel on which the fishermen used to conduct illegal fishing within Malaysia's rightful EEZ. Officials from the MMEA also confirmed that the Vietnamese fishermen attempted to aggressively ram the MMEA vessel besides throwing diesel bombs on the MMEA vessel to set it on fire.

On 5 April 2016, Indonesian authorities destroyed 23 illegal Vietnamese and Malaysian fishing boats that were trespassing its Indonesia's EEZ.

Piracy 
There are Indonesian pirates who frequently attack Malaysian, Singaporean and Vietnamese vessels. They occasionally hijack such as the MT Orkim Harmony and MT Zafirah hijacking incidents. Filipino pirates operate in the Sulu Sea and they can reach the South China Sea. This is near the Malaysian state of Sabah located on the northern portion of Borneo.

See also
 Territorial disputes in the South China Sea
 Exclusive economic zone of India
 Exclusive economic zone of Indonesia
 Exclusive economic zone of Thailand
 Pedra Branca dispute (Batu Puteh)
 Sabang strategic port development

References 

Malaysia
Borders of Malaysia
Economy of Malaysia
China–Malaysia relations